Chondropometes is a genus of land snails with an operculum, terrestrial gastropod mollusks in the family Annulariidae.

Species 
Species within the genus Chondropometes include:
Chondropometes bellisimum Torre & Bartsch, 1938
Chondropometes concolor Torre & Bartsch, 1938
Chondropometes eximium Torre & Bartsch, 1938
Chondropometes exquisitum Torre & Bartsch, 1938
Chondropometes latilabre (d’Orbigny, 1842)
Chondropometes magnum Torre & Bartsch, 1938
Chondropometes saccharinum Torre & Bartsch, 1938
Chondropometes sagebieni (Poey, 1858)
Chondropometes scopulorum Torre & Bartsch, 1938
Chondropometes segregatum Torre & Bartsch, 1938
Chondropometes torrei Bartsch, 1937
Chondropometes vignalense (Wright in Pfeiffer, 1863)

References 

 Bank, R. (2017). Classification of the Recent terrestrial Gastropoda of the World. Last update: July 16th, 2017
 Adrián González-Guillén, Luis A. Lajonchere-Ponce de León, and David P. Berschauer, The genus Chondropometes (Littorinoidea: Annulariidae) from the western karstic hills of Cuba; The Festivus, vol. 50 (4), November 2018.

Littorinimorpha